Sainte Marie La Grand’Grange in Saint-Chamond, Loire, France, is a primary through secondary school founded by the Marist Fathers in 1850, and currently run by the Society of Jesus.

Rankings

The middle school enjoys a near-perfect passing rate (99.5-100%).  The secondary school was rated by l'express as 2nd among 29 schools in the Loire department in 2016.

See also

 Catholic Church in France
 Education in France
 List of Jesuit schools

References

Jesuit secondary schools in France
Jesuit elementary and primary schools in France
Educational institutions established in 1877
1877 establishments in France
_z